Year 943 (CMXLIII) was a common year starting on Sunday (link will display the full calendar) of the Julian calendar.

Events 
 By place 

 Byzantine Empire 
 Spring – Allied with the Rus', a Hungarian army raids Moesia and Thrace. Emperor Romanos I buys peace, and accepts to pay a yearly tribute (protection money) to the Hungarians. His frontiers now 'protected' on the Balkan Peninsula, Romanos sends a Byzantine expeditionary force (80,000 men) led by general John Kourkouas (his commander-in-chief) to invade northern Mesopotamia (modern Iraq).

 Europe 
 Caspian expeditions of the Rus': The Rus' under the Varangian prince Igor I of Kiev sail up the Kura River, deep into the Caucasus, and defeat the forces of the Sallarid ruler Marzuban ibn Muhammad. They capture the fortress city of Barda (modern Azerbaijan).
 Battle of Wels: A joint Bavarian–Carantanian army led by Bertold (duke of Bavaria) defeats the Hungarians near Wels (Upper Austria), who are attacked at a crossing of the Enns River at Ennsburg.

 England 
 King Edmund I ravages Strathclyde and defeats the Scottish king Constantine II, who has reigned as king of Alba since 900. Constantine, ruler of the 'Picts and Scots', abdicates to enter a monastery and yields control of his realm to his cousin Malcolm I.
 The Trinity Bridge at Crowland, Lincolnshire is described, in the 'Charter of Eadred'.

Births 
 Dayang Jingxuan, Chinese Zen Buddhist monk (d. 1027)
 Edgar I (the Peaceful), king of England (approximate date) 
 Emma of Paris, duchess consort of Normandy (d. 968)
 Ibn Zur'a, Abbasid physician and philosopher (d. 1008)
 Matilda, queen consort of Burgundy (approximate date)

Deaths 
 February 23 
 David I, prince of Tao-Klarjeti (Georgia)
 Herbert II, Frankish nobleman
 February 26 – Muirchertach mac Néill, king of Ailech (Ireland)
 March 16 – Pi Guangye, chancellor of Wuyue (b. 877)
 March 30 – Li Bian, emperor of Southern Tang (b. 889)
 April 6 
 Liu Churang, Chinese general (b. 881)
 Nasr II, Samanid emir (b. 906)
 April 10 – Landulf I, prince of Benevento and Capua (Italy)
 April 15 – Liu Bin, emperor of Southern Han (b. 920)
 April 18 – Fujiwara no Atsutada, Japanese nobleman (b. 906)
 July 4 – Wang Kon, founder of Goryeo (Korea) (b. 877)
 July 26 – Motoyoshi, Japanese nobleman and poet (b. 890)
 November 8 – Liu, empress of Qi (Ten Kingdoms) (b. 877)
 Cao Zhongda, official and chancellor of Wuyue (b. 882)
 Gagik I of Vaspurakan, Armenian king (or 936)
 Liu Honggao, chancellor of Southern Han (b. 923)
 Sinan ibn Thabit, Persian physician (b. 880)
 Urchadh mac Murchadh, king of Maigh Seóla (Ireland)
 Xu Jie, Chinese officer and chancellor (b. 868)
 Zhang Yuxian, Chinese rebel leader (approximate date)

References